A Tway is a 1962 Burmese black-and-white drama film, directed by Shwe Done Bi Aung starring Maung Thin, Thi Thi, Aung Lwin, San Shar Tin and Kyauk Lone.

Cast
Maung Thin as Maung Thin
Thi Thi as Thi Thi
Aung Lwin as Maung Lwin
San Shar Tin as Ngwe Khin
Kyauk Lone as Kyauk Lone

Awards

References

1962 films
1960s Burmese-language films
Films shot in Myanmar
Burmese black-and-white films
1962 drama films
Burmese drama films